Dinosaur Journey Museum, or Museums of Western Colorado’s Dinosaur Journey, is a museum in Fruita in Mesa County, Colorado.

See also
Fruita Museum, a predecessor museum building in Fruita, built in 1938-39 as a Works Progress Administration project, listed on the National Register of Historic Places

References

External links
Museums of Western Colorado

Dinosaur museums in the United States
Museums in Mesa County, Colorado
Fruita, Colorado
Natural history museums in Colorado